Williams Place is a historic home and farm complex located near Glenn Springs, Spartanburg County, South Carolina. It was developed between about 1839 and 1850, and includes 10 contributing buildings, 1 contributing site, and 2 contributing structures. The majority of the buildings are of log construction and include a small house, a large house, a kitchen, a smokehouse, a smithy, two corn cribs, a ruined house, and barn / stable. Frame buildings and structures include a privy and a barn. Also on the property are a well and an earthen dam.

It was listed on the National Register of Historic Places in 1982.

References

External links

Farms on the National Register of Historic Places in South Carolina
Buildings and structures completed in 1850
Houses in Spartanburg County, South Carolina
National Register of Historic Places in Spartanburg County, South Carolina
Log buildings and structures on the National Register of Historic Places in South Carolina